Elisabeth Meyer may refer to:

 Elisabeth Meyer (photographer) (1899–1968), Norwegian photographer
 Elisabeth Meyer (composer) (1859–1927), Danish composer